Portography is a radiography of the portal vein after injection of radioopaque contrast material.

References

Projectional radiography